John Clein (1907–?) was an American film producer and film director, he was active in the United States and Britain. He produced and directed the 1939 film Keep Punching, whose cast was entirely composed of African-Americans; Clein himself was light-skinned.

Biography 
Clein was born in 1907 in Pittsburgh, Pennsylvania.

He received plaudits for his casting efforts. Clein made headlines in 1948 when he was kidnapped and forced to sign a contract for a dancer and an extra.

Filmography

Director
Keep Punching (1939)

Producer
Hearts of Humanity (1932)
Two Hearts in Harmony (1935)
The Mill on the Floss (1936)
Keep Punching (1939)
Passport to Shame (1958)
Dr. Crippen (1962)

Other roles
Shadow of Fear (1956) – credited as "Liason"

Theater
Devils Galore (1945)
Swan Song (1946), producer, released as Broadway theatre at Booth Theatre

References

External links 

 

1907 births
Date of death missing